Haplogroup R-L295 also known as R2a1 is a Y-chromosome haplogroup characterized by genetic marker L295, which has been found in South Asia, Anatolia, Arabian Peninsula, Europe and Central Asia.

Subclades

Paragroup R-L295* 
Paragroup is a term used in population genetics to describe lineages within a haplogroup that are not defined by any additional unique markers. They are typically represented by an asterisk (*) placed after the main haplogroup.

Y-chromosomes which are positive to the L295 SNP and negative to the L294 SNP, are categorized as belonging to Paragroup R-L295*. It is found in South Asia, Anatolia, Arabian Peninsula, Europe, & Central Asia so far.

Haplogroup R-L294 

Haplogroup R-L294 is represented by the L294 SNP and found in Armenia and Turkey so far.

Notes

See also

Y-DNA R-M207 subclades

Y-DNA backbone tree

External links
 R2 Y-Chromosome Haplogroup DNA Project
 Digging into Haplogroup R2 (Y-DNA)
 R2-M124-WTY (Walk Through the Y) Project

R-L295
R